Dejémonos de Vargas is a Colombian telenovela produced by TeleColombia for RCN Televisión and a spin-off of the sitcom Dejémonos de vainas, that aired between 1983 and 1998. The telenovela stars Carlos Camacho and Margarita Muñoz. It premiered on Canal RCN on 13 July 2022.

Plot 
Dejémonos de Vargas revolves around a typical middle class family, who struggle day by day to cope with the daily problems they face. The family is composed by Ramoncito, who has a streak of bad luck and is looking for a way out of his economic crisis; his wife Valentina, a successful lawyer; and their teenage son Agustín.

Cast

Main 
 Carlos Camacho as Ramón Vargas
 Margarita Muñoz as Valentina Restrepo
 Andrea Guzmán as Mireya Salazar
 Aco Pérez as Juan Caicedo Rojas
 Nataly Umaña as Alejandra Misas
 Emmanuel Saldarriaga as Agustín Julio
 Melissa Cabrera as Camila Salazar
 Laura Florez as Yenniffer Chivata

Recurring 
 Paula Peña as Renata Hermelinda Villegas de Vargas
 Marisol Correa as Margarita Vargas
 Constanza Duque as Lucy
 Maru Yamayusa as Josefa Chivatá

Guest stars 
 Mario Ruiz
 Julio Pachón as Samuel Miranda
 Katherine Giraldo
 Ricardo Saldarriaga
 Valerie Bertagnini
 Giovanny Almonacid
 Tirza Pacheco
 Roberto Roldán
 Carlos Guerrero
 Sebastián Montenegro
 Carlos Vizcaino
 Camilo Morales
 Esperanza Caro
 Gabriel Ramírez

Ratings 
The series premiered with 6.3 points in household ratings and initially aired weeknights. Due to low ratings, the series moved to the weekends on 13 August 2022, with Canal RCN rerunning the first twenty-two episodes. New episodes resumed on 16 October 2022.

Episodes

References 

2022 telenovelas
2022 Colombian television series debuts
Colombian telenovelas
RCN Televisión telenovelas
Spanish-language telenovelas